Why Me? is a 1990 American caper comedy film directed by Gene Quintano and starring Christopher Lambert, Kim Greist, Christopher Lloyd, and J. T. Walsh. The screenplay is credited to Donald E. Westlake and Leonard Maas Jr. (a pseudonym of David Koepp), and is based on the fifth book in Westlake's series of John Dortmunder novels.

Plot
The Byzantine Fire, a sacred ruby on loan from Turkey to the United States for exhibition, no sooner arrives in Los Angeles than it is stolen by Eastern religious extremists and hidden inside the safe of a local jewelry store. When professional burglar and jewel thief Gus Cardinale (Christopher Lambert) breaks into the store and inadvertently steals the Byzantine Fire, he finds himself being chased around Los Angeles by the LAPD, the entire Los Angeles criminal element (whom the police have been mercilessly harassing in order to find the thief), two less-than-competent CIA agents, Turkish government agents and a not-too-tightly wrapped female Armenian terrorist. Now Gus, with the help of his wacky partner Bruno (Christopher Lloyd) and his girlfriend June (Kim Greist), must figure out a way to not only return the Byzantine Fire without getting caught but also stay alive long enough to do so and just maybe make a profit out of the whole deal.

Cast
 Christopher Lambert as Gus Cardinale
 Kim Greist as June Daley
 Christopher Lloyd as Bruno Daley
 J. T. Walsh as Chief Inspector Francis Mahoney
 Gregory Millar as Leon
 Wendel Meldrum as Gatou Vardebedian
 Michael J. Pollard as Ralph
 John Hancock as Tiny

Release
The film was released on April 20, 1990 in the United States.

External links
 
 
 
 

1990 films
1990 comedy films
1990s crime comedy films
1990s comedy thriller films
1990s English-language films
1990s heist films
American comedy thriller films
American crime comedy films
American heist films
Films based on American novels
Films based on works by Donald E. Westlake
Films directed by Gene Quintano
Films with screenplays by David Koepp
Films set in Los Angeles
Triumph Films films
1990s American films